The Legendary Starfy, known as  in Japan, is a 2008 marine platform video game developed by Tose and published by Nintendo for the Nintendo DS handheld video game console. It is the fifth game in The Legendary Starfy video game series. On June 8, 2009, the game became the first, and so far the only, in the series to be released outside Japan.

The Legendary Starfy received positive reviews for its presentation, story and amount of content, although it was met with criticism for its low difficulty.

Plot
Pufftop Palace's prince Starfy is suddenly awakened by a rabbit who fell from the sky through the roof of the palace. A group of pirates, the Terrible Trio fails to capture the rabbit; Starfy then searches the rabbit after he escaped and, alongside Moe, goes into the ocean.

After saving the rabbit from a gigantic octopus, Starfy recovers a crystal shard, and the rabbit, presenting himself as Bunston, is revealed to be amnesiac. All together, they cross along the ocean to retrieve the missing shards.

Learning the shards are parts of a ship, Bunston recovers his memory and the events: as a prince of the planet Bunnera, he holds the most of their powers. The Terrible Trio was sent by the space pirate Mashtooth to steal the Bunnera's power. Bunston escaped in a ship predestinated to Pufftop.

With the ship rebuilt, they depart to Bunnera and confront Mashtooth; Starfy winning, Mashtooth crashes on to the moon and he never was seen after. Starfy and Moe return to Pufftop and take a nap. Meanwhile, Starly – Starfy's sister – searches for him.

Gameplay

The game is described as a "sea platformer", where it takes similarities from  Kirby. The player controls Starfy in underwater segments, where the character can spin and dive, and can also exit the water for some land sections.

Pearls, the game's currency, are used to buy items and retrieve health. Each stage has treasure chests, whose rewards are collectibles such as costumes or heart-shaped stones which give Starfy more health.

The game uses the dual-screen function to show a variety of information on the lower screen, such as a mermaid giving a summary of the level's mission; Moe gives the players hints to get treasures and secrets doors; Bunston shows the player's main progress of the story and upgrades; Old Man Lobber summarizes the current exploration's statistics and rank.

Returning from the previous four Starfy titles are costumes that offer special abilities, including ghost, dragon, chicken, and an ice-tailed seal costume. Unlike other games in the series, instead of touching a costume, Starfy touches Bunston's thought bubbles to put on a costume. The game also has DS wireless co-op play in select areas and boss fights, where one person controls Starfy and the other controls Starly. Only one cartridge copy of the game is required for this feature. Five different minigames are offered, one of them a cooking game starring Starly. Returning from earlier entries in the series is the wardrobe collection in which players dress Starfy and Starly in different outfits.

Development
The Legendary Starfy is the first game in the series to be released outside Japan. Nintendo of America previously found games in the series to be "too Japanese" for a North American release. The joint decision by Nintendo and Tose to finally release the Starfy series abroad came about because the Nintendo DS was doing well in the market. Yurie Hattori, assistant director for the Starfy series states "it's a game that's really the result of all the great ideas we had in [Densetsu no Stafy] 1-4. This is a really accessible game and a great starting point to bring it to the US". Very few changes were made for the game's English adaptation. To promote the game, a launch event was held at the Nintendo World Store in New York City on July 11, 2009.

Reception

Reviews

The Legendary Starfy has received generally positive reviews. Reviews have commented on the game's similarities to Kirby. Reviewers have applauded the size and depth of the world, and creative story telling presented to the player.

IGN Nintendo Team editor Mark Bozon expressed in his review that the game contains an "incredible amount" of activities, and can feel almost cluttered at times because of this. Game Informers Matt Helgeson said in his review of the game that "[it] isn't mind-blowing, but it's certainly well crafted and bolstered by some genuinely funny writing". Both of the Game Informer staff who reviewed the game also found that the cooldown (character's dizziness) after performing Starfy's spin attack too many times was "annoying".

Sales
The Legendary Starfy debuted on the Japanese sales charts at number 3, selling 29,000 copies. It is the slowest debut for the series so far. Media Create sales data lists the game at having sold 126,428 copies in Japan by the end of 2008. Public sales information from Amazon.com suggests that The Legendary Starfy was the top-selling Nintendo DS game in North America during its week of release, temporarily beating out previous top-sellers on the platform such as Mario Kart DS and New Super Mario Bros. NPD Group reports that the game was the 19th best-selling game in North America during the months of June and July 2009.

Notes

References

External links
 Official English website
 Official Japanese website 
 Official web page for The Legendary Starfy at Nintendo.com
 Starfy Wiki

2008 video games
Nintendo DS games
Nintendo DS-only games
Platform games
Tose (company) games
Video games developed in Japan
Video games set on fictional planets
Video games with underwater settings
The Legendary Starfy